Ballantyne may refer to:

People
 Charles Ballantyne (1867–1950), Canadian politician
 David Ballantyne (1924–1986), a New Zealand journalist, novelist and short-story writer
 Edith Ballantyne (born 1922), Czech-born Canadian executive secretary/president of the Women's International League for Peace and Freedom from 1969 to 1998
 Elspeth Ballantyne (born 1939), an Australian actress
 David Ballantyne (1825–1912), Scottish woolen manufacturer, Scottish Borders
 Frederick Ballantyne (1936–2020), Governor-General of St. Vincent and the Grenadines
 George Ballantyne (1836–1924), Scottish woolen manufacturer, Walkerburn, Scottish Borders, owner of The Kirna
 Hayden Ballantyne (born 1987), a professional Australian rules footballer
 Henry Ballantyne (1802–1865), Scottish woolen manufacturer, Scottish Borders
 Sir Henry Ballantyne (1855–1941), Scottish woolen manufacturer, Scottish Borders
 Henry Ballantyne (1842–1928), Scottish woolen manufacturer, Scottish Borders
 Ian Ballantyne (born 1958), a former Scottish footballer who also played in Hong Kong
 James Ballantyne (1772–1833), Scottish publisher
 James Ballantyne (1839–1903), Scottish woolen manufacturer, Scottish Borders
 James R. Ballantyne (1813–1864), Scottish grammarian of Hindi
 Jean Ballantyne (1906–1980), a New Zealand ballet teacher and choreographer
 Jim Ballantyne, president of The Scottish Football League
 John Ballantyne (publisher) (1774–1821), a Scottish author and publisher notable for his work with Walter Scott
 John Ballantyne (footballer) (1892 – after 1917), a Scottish professional footballer
 John Ballantyne (minister) (1778–1830), a Scottish minister of religion
 John Ballantyne (1829–1909), Scottish woolen manufacturer, Scottish Borders
 John Ballantyne or Bellenden (fl. 1533-1587?), a Scottish writer of the 16th century
 John Ballantyne, a plaintiff in a case on Quebec's language law in 1993
 Johnny Ballantyne (1899-?), an early twentieth-century Scottish football player
 Jon Ballantyne (footballer) (born 1969), a former Australian rules footballer in the Australian Football League
 Jon Ballantyne (born 1963), a Canadian, musician, composer, and artist
 Joyce Ballantyne (1918–2006), American painter of pin-ups
 Ken Ballantyne (1940–2016), Scottish athlete
 Linda Ballantyne (born 1964), Canadian voice actress
 Michael Ballantyne (1945–2008), a politician from the Northwest Territories, Canada
 Milton Ballantyne (1928–2015), Australian politician
 Paul Ballantyne (actor) (1909–1996), an American actor.
 Richard Ballantyne (1817–1898), founder of the Sunday School of The Church of Jesus Christ of Latter-day Saints
 Robert Michael Ballantyne (1825–1894), 19th-century Scottish juvenile fiction author
 Ron Ballantyne, rugby league footballer of the 1960s for New Zealand, and Northland
 Sara Ballantyne (field hockey) (born 1964), a Canadian field hockey player who competed in the 1988 Summer Olympics
 Sheila Ballantyne
 Thomas Ballantyne (1829–1908), a Canadian politician and Speaker of the Ontario Legislature
 Thomas Ballantyne (journalist) (1806–1871), a Scottish journalist
 Tony Ballantyne (historian) (born 1972), New Zealand historian
 Tony Ballantyne (writer) (born 1972), a British science-fiction author

Places
 Ballantynes Cove, a community in Antigonish County, Nova Scotia, Canada
 Ballyntine Cove, Newfoundland and Labrador, a settlement in the province of Newfoundland and Labrador, Canada
 Ballantyne Strait, a natural waterway through in the Northwest Territories of Canada
 Ballantyne Pier, a commercial and passenger dock of the Port of Vancouver, British Columbia, Canada
 Ballantyne Lake a lake in Jamestown Township in Blue Earth County, Minnesota, US
 Ballantyne (Charlotte neighborhood), a neighborhood in Charlotte, North Carolina, US
 Ballantyne Park, a city park in Ottawa, Ontario, Canada 
 Ballantynes, a department store in Christchurch, New Zealand

Other
 Ballantyne the Brave, a biography of the juvenile fiction writer, Robert Michael Ballantyne
 Ballantyne's fire, a disastrous fire in Christchurch, New Zealand in 1947
 The Ballantyne Novels, a series of four novels published between 1980 and 1984 by Wilbur Smith
 Ballantyne syndrome, a rare disorder affecting pregnant women
 Henry Ballantyne and Sons Ltd., Woollen Manufacturers, Walkerburn, Scottish Borders

See also
Ballantine
Ballantine (disambiguation)
Ballantine (surname)
Bellenden
Ballenden
Ballandean, Queensland
Balindean, the spelling used by the Ogilvy-Wedderburn baronets
Balanchine